Clinton Antwi (born 6 November 1999) is a Ghanaian professional footballer who plays as a defender for Veikkausliiga club KuPS.

Career
Antwi played for the Right to Dream Academy before joining FC Nordsjælland in January 2018. He spent his first half season in spring 2018 in the U19 team in the U19 league. In the summer of 2018 he trained with the club's first team.

On 18 July 2018, Antwi made his debut in the UEFA Europa League starting in a 2–1 home victory against Cliftonville. He conceded a sixth-minute penalty.

Antwi got his debut in the Superliga for FC Nordjælland on 22 July 2018, when he was substituted 37 minutes into the game for an injured Mads Mini Pedersen in a 1–1 draw against AGF. On 23 September 2020, Antwi joined Danish 1st Division club Esbjerg fB on loan for the rest of the season.

On 7 January 2021, Antwi signed a two-year deal with Finnish club KuPS.

References

1999 births
Living people
Ghanaian footballers
Association football defenders
Danish Superliga players
FC Nordsjælland players
Esbjerg fB players
Kuopion Palloseura players
Ghanaian expatriate footballers
Ghanaian expatriate sportspeople in Denmark
Expatriate men's footballers in Denmark
Ghanaian expatriate sportspeople in Finland
Expatriate footballers in Finland
People from Tamale, Ghana